Hull  Town F.C. was an English association football club from Kingston upon Hull in Yorkshire.

History

In 1879, at the Crown & Cushion Hotel in Hull, members of the Hull Cricket Club agreed to form an association football section to keep the players fit during the winter season.  The rules of the new club included a provision that the club would play in amber and black.

Hitherto, Kingston upon Hull had been a rugby town; Hull FC had played a handful of association matches in the 1860s, but otherwise all football in the town was to the oval ball code.  Hull Town was the first dedicated association football club in Hull.

Within a couple of years the town had other clubs, and the Scarborough & East Riding Cup final in 1882-83 was played between two of them, Hull losing to Blue Star. In 1883-84 Hull Town merged with Blue Star and the Dairycoates club, and moved ground from the cricket ground on Argyle Street to the Dairycoates ground in Hessle Street.  With the extra choice of players, entered the FA Cup for the first time.  The club lost 3–1 to Grimsby Town in the first round, and, in 1884-85, lost again in the first round, at home to Lincoln City, by a score variously reported as being 5-1 or 5–2, having been ahead at half-time.

After a series of dispiriting defeats, the club disbanded in 1887.  It was reformed a year later but dissolved again at the end of the season.

The name Hull Town was revived in 1896 for a club founded by the rugby side Hull Kingston Rovers, who merged with the Albany club for the purposes of fielding an association football side.  The new club reached the final of both the Scarborough & East Riding and Hull Times cups in 1897, but disappeared in 1898 with other clubs taking on the association mantle.

References

Defunct football clubs in England
Football clubs in Yorkshire